Susan Ershler is an American mountain climber and an author. Ershler and her husband, Phil, are the first couple to have together climbed the highest mountain on each continent, known as the "Seven Summits".

Climbing
Ershler started climbing in the 1990s. In 1992, Ershler met her husband, Phil, a mountain guide who made the first American ascent of the North Face of Mount Everest.

On May 16, 2002, at 10:20 a.m. the Ershlers reached the summit of Mount Everest and became the first couple to have climbed the Seven Summits together. Their ascent achieved a degree of wider note as they were in the group of 54 people who were climbing to celebrate the first ascent of Mount Everest by Edmund Hillary and Tenzing Norgay, which included Norgay's son.

Later life 
Ershler continued to talk and write articles about climbing mountains in the years that followed her ascents.

Published works

References

External links
 

Living people
American mountain climbers
American sportswomen
American women in business
Businesspeople from Portland, Oregon
Female climbers
Washington State University alumni
21st-century American women
Year of birth missing (living people)